Fatemeh Adeli (born 16 July 1995) is an Iranian footballer who plays as a defender for Kowsar Women Football League club Sepahan SC and the senior Iran women's national team.

References 

1995 births
Living people
Iranian women's footballers
Iran women's international footballers
Footballers at the 2010 Summer Youth Olympics
Women's association football defenders
People from Isfahan Province
21st-century Iranian women